Union Cemetery is a historic cemetery on Woodside Road (CA 84) near El Camino Real in Redwood City, San Mateo County, California. The cemetery was named a California Historical Landmark #816 in 1967, then added to the National Register of Historic Places in 1983.

History 
Founded in 1859, this is the site of the first American burial ground in San Mateo County, and was originally located just outside the town limits of Redwood City. The cemetery officially closed in 1918, but it was used for many years after that for burial of the poor. There are special cemetery plots for the Masonic Order, members of the International Order of Odd Fellows and the California volunteers who fought during the Civil War.

Soldier statue 
The life-sized metal sculpture of a civil war veteran was erected during 1889 for a Memorial Day celebration, the earliest such celebration on the Peninsula. The statue was paid for by Jane Lathrop Stanford. It was vandalized in 1958, 1959 and 1969, but was subsequently repaired, and in 1999 it was replaced with a replica constructed of more durable material.

Notable graves 

 Lester Phillip Cooley (1837–1882) was an early pioneer of East Palo Alto and Cooley Landing.
John Howell Sears (1823–1907) was an early pioneer of Searsville and La Honda.
 Sarah Wallis (1825–1905) was an early Anglophone settler in California and first President of the California Woman Suffrage Educational Association.

Gallery

See also

California Historical Landmarks in San Mateo County, California
National Register of Historic Places listings in San Mateo County, California
Pioneer cemetery
San Mateo County History Museum
Union (American Civil War)

References

External links

 
 

Redwood City, California
Protected areas of San Mateo County, California
Cemeteries in San Mateo County, California
Cemeteries on the National Register of Historic Places in California
National Register of Historic Places in San Mateo County, California